Wairarapa duplaris is a species of sea snail, a marine gastropod mollusk in the family Drilliidae.

Description
The length of the shell attains 8 mm, its diameter 3 mm.

(Original description) The small, solid shell has a lanceolate shape. Its colour is dull cream, with a faint dorsal zone of brown. It contains 8 whorls, including a two-whorled protoconch. The radial sculpture is smooth and consists of round-backed perpendicular ribs truncated by a smooth and constricted fasciole, amounting to eleven on the penultimate whorl. On the earlier part of the body whorl these ribs are smaller and closer together than previously. Half a whorl behind the aperture is a rough varix, beyond which the ribs cease. The spiral sculpture on the base shows about a dozen fine grooves. Between the suture and the fasciole is a spiral ridge which tends to break up into beads opposite the ribs. The aperture is narrow. The sinus is C-shaped. A thick callus knob occurs at the right insertion.

Distribution
This marine species is endemic to Australia and occurs off Queensland.

References

 Wells, F.E. 1990. Revision of the recent Australian Turridae referred to the genera Splendrillia and Austrodrillia. Journal of the Malacological Society of Australasia 11: 73–117
 Wilson, B. 1994. Australian Marine Shells. Prosobranch Gastropods. Kallaroo, WA : Odyssey Publishing Vol. 2 370 pp.

External links
  Tucker, J.K. 2004 Catalog of recent and fossil turrids (Mollusca: Gastropoda). Zootaxa 682:1–1295.

duplaris
Gastropods of Australia
Gastropods described in 1922